A sunhouse is a lean-to Conservatory (greenhouse)

Sunhouse may also refer to:
Sunhouse, dwellings found in Arnstein, Germany
The Sunhouse (1925) by Joris Ivens
Sunhouse (band)